Michael Cassidy (born March 20, 1983) is an American film and television actor. He is best known for his role as Zach Stevens on The O.C. and as Tyler Mitchell on the TBS comedy Men at Work. He portrayed Jonathan Walsh on comedy People of Earth from the show's start in 2016 until its 2018 cancellation.

Early life 
Cassidy was born in Portland, Oregon. He graduated from La Salle High School in Milwaukie, Oregon, in 2001, and graduated from the Two-Year Conservatory program at The New Actors Workshop in New York City in 2003.

Career 
Cassidy is perhaps best known for his role as Zach Stevens throughout the second season of the television series The O.C.; his character had an on-again/off-again relationship with Summer Roberts. Cassidy also has a role in the movie Zoom.

In 2007, Cassidy played Cliff Wiatt in The CW television program, Hidden Palms.

Cassidy joined the cast of Smallville, a television show based on the DC Comics' superhero Superman, in the series' seventh season, starring as the new editor of the Daily Planet, Grant Gabriel, a  love interest of Lois Lane. In truth, he was Julian Luthor, the cloned and aged brother of Lex. In the episode "Persona," Cassidy's character was shot dead, marking the end of his character's saga. Cassidy later returned to the Superman franchise portraying Jimmy Olsen in the 2016 film Batman v Superman: Dawn of Justice.

He played Charlie Hogan, the best friend of Megan Smith (JoAnna Garcia) in the first fourteen episodes of the television show Privileged.

Cassidy then portrayed Tyler Mitchell on the TBS show Men at Work for 3 seasons.

Cassidy also had small roles in the film Argo, and in The Guilt Trip, both in 2012.

On February 27, 2015, Cassidy had joined NBC workplace comedy pilot, Not Safe for Work, however, the pilot was passed on.

Cassidy joined TBS pilot People of Earth opposite Wyatt Cenac. It was picked up for series on January 7, 2016. Cassidy played the charismatic and successful Jonathan Walsh, CEO of Walsh Media.

Personal life 
In August 2006, Cassidy married girlfriend Laura Eichhorn, whom he met in high school. They have three children.

Filmography

Film

Television

Web

References

External links 
 
 

1983 births
American male film actors
American male television actors
Living people
Male actors from Portland, Oregon
People from Milwaukie, Oregon
21st-century American male actors